The Costești is a left tributary of the river Bistrița in Romania. It flows into the Bistrița in the village Costești.

References

Rivers of Romania
Rivers of Vâlcea County